Çankaya is a district of Ankara, Turkey. It is home to many government buildings, including the Grand National Assembly of Turkey, as well as nearly all foreign embassies to Turkey. Çankaya is a cosmopolitan district and considered the cultural and financial center of Ankara.

Demographics 
The population of the central province is close to 1 million in 2016.

History

Until the founding of the Republic of Turkey in 1923, Çankaya was a hillside of orchards and gardens to the south of the city, which had grown up in time, surrounding the Ankara Castle (Kale) on the opposite hill. Everything changed in the 1920s when Mustafa Kemal Atatürk came to stay in one of the garden houses. Atatürk selected Ankara as capital of the new republic and in the 1920s and 30s the city quickly grew, especially in the direction of Çankaya. In 1934 the writer Yakup Kadri Karaosmanoğlu described the area as "a wooden bridge, a dirt road, and when you come round the hill you see a hillside, green in gentle contours. That's Çankaya." Çankaya eventually developed into one of the largest central districts of Ankara in later years.

Climate
The climate in Çankaya is cold and temperate. The winter months are much rainier than the summer months in Çankaya. The Köppen-Geiger climate classification is Dsa. The average annual temperature in Çankaya is 11.5 °C. In a year, the average rainfall is 384 mm.

Culture

The early buildings of the republic were in grand Ottoman style, but today Çankaya also contains a number of impressive modern buildings. The district is home to a great number of museums, theatres, cinemas, cultural associations, booksellers, publishers and libraries, including the National Library in a new building. Many of the streets in the district are named after poets, writers and thinkers.

Most of Ankara's best-known high schools and a great number of university buildings are in the district, including the large campuses of METU, Bilkent University and (most of) Hacettepe University. Çankaya University, a private institution owned by businessman Sıtkı Alp, was opened in a number of former school buildings in 1997.

Neighbourhoods 
There are 124 neighbourhoods in Çankaya as of 2017.

 100.Yıl
 50.Yıl
 Ahlatlıbel
 Ahmet Taner Kışlalı
 Akarlar
 Akpınar
 Alacaatlı
 Anıttepe
 Aşağı Dikmen
 Aşağı İmrahor
 Aşağı Öveçler
 Aşağı Topraklık
 Aşıkpaşa
 Ata
 Aydınlar
 Ayrancı
 Aziziye
 Bademlidere
 Bağcılar
 Bahçelievler
 Balgat
 Barbaros
 Bayraktar
 Beytepe
 Birlik
 Boztepe
 Büyükesat
 Cebeci
 Cevizlidere
 Cumhuriyet
 Çamlıtepe
 Çankaya
 Çavuşlu
 Çayyolu
 Çiğdem
 Çukurambar
 Devlet
 Dilekler
 Dodurga
 Doğuş
 Ehlibeyt
 Emek
 Ertuğrulgazi
 Erzurum
 Esatoğlu
 Eti
 Evciler
 Fakülteler
 Fidanlık
 Gaziosmanpaşa
 Gökkuşağı
 Göktürk
 Güvenevler
 Güzeltepe
 Harbiye
 Hilal
 Huzur
 İleri
 İlkadım
 İlkbahar
 İlker
 İncesu
 İşçi Blokları
 Karahasanlı
 Karapınar
 Karataş
 Kavaklıdere
 Kazım Özalp
 Keklikpınarı
 Kırkkonaklar
 Kızılay
 Kızılırmak
 Kocatepe
 Konutkent
 Korkutreis
 Koru
 Kömürcü
 Küçükesat
 Kültür
 Malazgirt
 Maltepe
 Mebusevleri
 Meşrutiyet
 Metin Akkuş
 Metin Oktay
 Mimar Sinan
 Muhsin Ertuğrul
 Murat
 Mustafa Kemal
 Mutlukent
 Mürsel Uluç
 Naci Çakır
 Namık Kemal
 Nasuh Akar
 Oğuzlar
 Oran
 Orta İmrahor
 Osman Temiz
 Ön Cebeci
 Öveçler
 Remzi Oğuz Arık
 Sağlık
 Sancak
 Seyranbağları
 Sokullu Mehmet Paşa
 Söğütözü
 Şehit Cengiz Karaca
 Şehit Cevdet Özdemir
 Tınaztepe
 Tohumlar
 Topraklık
 Umut
 Ümit
 Üniversiteler
 Yakupabdal
 Yaşamkent
 Yayla
 Yeşilkent
 Yıldızevler
 Yukarı Bahçelievler
 Yukarı Dikmen
 Yukarı Öveçler
 Yücetepe
 Zafertepe

Politics and government 
Çankaya has always played an important role in politics, government, and diplomacy, as the Grand National Assembly is located in the district as well as the former residence of the President of Turkey. Various embassies can be found in the district.

Çankaya is an overwhelmingly CHP-voting district both in local elections. The party has plurality when it comes to general elections. CHP holds a supermajority in Çankaya District Council, with 37 out of 45 members of the district council also being a member of the party.

Places of interest
 The Museum of Anatolian Civilizations
 Anıtkabir the mausoleum of Atatürk
 Ankara Ethnography Museum
 Atakule Tower
 Çankaya Köşkü - the former residence of the President of Turkey
 Pembe Köşk - the residence of Turkish President İsmet İnönü from 1925 to 1973
 THF Sport Hall

Notes

References

External links

 Presidency of Turkey, official website 
 District governor's official website 
 District municipality's official website 
 The Kavaklıdere resident's association 

 
Populated places in Ankara Province
Districts of Ankara Province